This is a list of Washburn Ichabods football season records. The Washburn Ichabods football team is the football team of Washburn University, located in the American city of[Topeka, Kansas]. The team competes as a Mid-America Intercollegiate Athletics Association (MIAA) at the NCAA Division II level.

When the program began in 1891, the team did not have a nickname. That changed however, in 1904 when "Sons of the Ichabod nickname was printed in the first edition of The Kaw yearbook. Since 1928, Washburn football has played in Yager Stadium at Moore Bowl, named after former Washburn running back, Gary Yager.

Washburn has won 12 conference championships: four in the Kansas Conference, six in the Central Intercollegiate Athletic Conference, one in the Central States Intercollegiate Conference, and one in the Mid-America Intercollegiate Athletics Association.

Seasons
, the records are up–to–date.

|- style=""
| colspan="8" style="text-align:center;"| 

|- style=""
| colspan="8" style="text-align:center;"| 

|- style=""
| colspan="8" style="text-align:center;"| 

|- style=""
| colspan="8" style="text-align:center;"| 

|- style=""
| colspan="8" style="text-align:center;"| 

|- style=""
| colspan="8" style="text-align:center;"| 

|- style=""
| colspan="8" style="text-align:center;"|

References

Washburn Ichabods

Washburn Ichabods football seasons